Haris Skenderović (born 3 November 1981) is a Bosnian retired footballer who last played for AFC Eskilstuna. He played as a central defender. Skenderović has previously played for Stabæk in Tippeligaen.

Club career
Born in Bužim, SR Bosnia and Herzegovina, he started playing in the local team Vitez where he first became senior. At the very beginning of his career he will spend a stint on loan at FK Krajina Cazin before returning to Vitez from where he later moved to NK Jedinstvo Bihać.

Career statistics

Source:

References

External links
 Player history
 US Monastir, Haris Skenderovic sign with US Monastir
    Vasalundsback till tunisiska högstaligan. Haris Skenderovic på väg till ligatvåan US Monastir

1981 births
Living people
People from Bužim
Association football defenders
Bosnia and Herzegovina footballers
Bosnia and Herzegovina under-21 international footballers
NK Jedinstvo Bihać players
Vasalunds IF players
US Monastir (football) players
IK Sirius Fotboll players
Syrianska FC players
Stabæk Fotball players
AFC Eskilstuna players
Premier League of Bosnia and Herzegovina players
Superettan players
Eliteserien players
Allsvenskan players
Ettan Fotboll players
Bosnia and Herzegovina expatriate footballers
Expatriate footballers in Sweden
Bosnia and Herzegovina expatriate sportspeople in Sweden
Expatriate footballers in Tunisia
Expatriate footballers in Norway
Bosnia and Herzegovina expatriate sportspeople in Norway